The High Street Historic District in Burlington, New Jersey, is a historic district listed on  state and federal registers of historic places. It is adjacent to the city's Burlington Historic District. The district, which is a certified local district, comprises the buildings at 201–467 and 200–454 High Street and 13–37 and 10–22 East Broad. The boundary increase of 2014 includes the building at 6 West Pearl Street, a brewery building dating from 1682, now a residence.

See also
 List of the oldest buildings in New Jersey
 National Register of Historic Places listings in Burlington County, New Jersey
 Quaker School (Burlington)
 Burlington Towne Centre (River Line station)

References

External links
 Tour Burlington 

Burlington, New Jersey
Buildings and structures in Burlington County, New Jersey
National Register of Historic Places in Burlington County, New Jersey
Historic districts in Burlington County, New Jersey